Valenzuela perplexus is a species of lizard barklouse in the family Caeciliusidae. It is found in Central America and North America.

References

Caeciliusidae
Articles created by Qbugbot
Insects described in 1930